Acacesium or Akakesion, was a town of ancient Arcadia in the district of Parrhasia, at the foot of a hill of the same name, and 36 stadia on the road from Megalopolis to Phigalea. It is said to have been founded by Acacus, son of Lycaon; and according to some traditions Hermes was brought up at this place by Acacus, and hence derived the surname of Acacesius. Upon the hill there was a statue in stone, in the time of Pausanias, of Hermes Acacesius; and four stadia from the town was a celebrated temple of Despoena. This temple probably stood on the hill, on which are now the remains of the church of St Elias.

Its site is located near modern Daseiai.

References

Populated places in ancient Arcadia
Former populated places in Greece
Cities in ancient Greece
Parrhasia